Tales Along This Road is the third studio album by Finnish folk metal band Korpiklaani. It was released on 21 April 2006 by Napalm Records.

Track listing
All music composed by Jonne Järvelä. All lyrics written by Jonne Järvelä, except tracks 2, 4, 7 & 9 lyrics by Virva Holtiton, track 3 lyrics by Jarkko Aaltonen and track 8 lyrics by Jonne Järvelä, Virva Holtiton & Jarkko Aaltonen.

Personnel
 Jonne Järvelä - vocals, guitars, mandolin
 Matti Johansson - drums, backing vocals
 Jarkko Aaltonen - bass
 Cane - guitars, backing vocals
 Juho Kauppinen - accordion,  backing vocals, guitars
 Hittavainen - violin, jouhikko, tin whistle, recorder, torupill, mandolin, mouth harp

Guest musicians
 Samuel Dan - backing vocals
 Virva Holtiton - kantele, throat singing

Production
 Toni Härkönen - photography
 Mika Jussila - mastering
 Jonne Järvelä - producer
 Samu Oittinen - producer, recording, mixing
 Jan "Örkki" Yrlund - cover art, artwork

References

2006 albums
Korpiklaani albums
Napalm Records albums